The 1985 Speedway World Pairs Championship was the sixteenth FIM Speedway World Pairs Championship. The final took place in Rybnik, Poland. The championship was won by Denmark (29 points) who they beat England (27 pts) and United States (22 pts).

The 1985 World Pairs Final was the last World Championship Final appearance of legendary New Zealand rider Ivan Mauger. In a career lasting almost 30 years, Mauger had won 15 World Championships, including a record 6 Individual World Championships, 4 World Team Cups, 3 Long Track World Championships and 2 World Pairs Championships.

Preliminary round
  Blijham
 April 21

Semifinal 1
  Norden
 May 26

Semifinal 2
  Bradford
 June 1

World final
  Rybnik, Rybnik Municipal Stadium
 June 15

See also
 1985 Individual Speedway World Championship
 1985 Speedway World Team Cup
 motorcycle speedway
 1985 in sports

References

1985
World Pairs
World